Garypidae is a family of pseudoscorpions.

Genera
 Ammogarypus Beier, 1962
 Anagarypus Chamberlin, 1930
 Elattogarypus Beier, 1964
 Eremogarypus Beier, 1955
 Garypus L. Koch, 1873
 Meiogarypus Beier, 1955
 Neogarypus Vachon, 1937
 Paragarypus Vachon, 1937
 Synsphyronus Chamberlin, 1930
 Thaumastogarypus Beier, 1947

Pseudoscorpion families